Jens Jacob Tychsen (born 19 November 1975) is a Danish actor and casting/voice director.

Tychsen graduated from the School of Acting at Aarhus Theatre in 1998 and has since appeared in a number of productions in theatres across the country.

In 1998, he was involved with Aarhus Theatre, where he starred in plays like The Last Temptations, Les Misérables, Servant of Two Masters and A Clockwork Orange.

Jens Jacob Tychsen has also lent his voice to numerous commercials, documentaries and animated films, such as different series of Disney.

Filmography

Feature films 
 Aftermath (2004) – Waiter
 Strings (2005) – Hal Tara
 Paddington (2015) – Policeman
 Mugge & Vejfesten (2019) – Mugge (voice)

TV series 
 Unit One, Episodes 29–30 (2002) – Simon Friis
 Hidden Track, Episodes 22–23 (2003) – Joe Smith
 Krøniken, Episode 10 (2004) – Lawaetz Radio Voice (voice)
 2900 Happiness, Episodes 37–41 (2007) – Lars Fromberg
 Summer, Episode 7 (2008) – Niels
 The Killing II, Episodes 1–10 (2009) – Erling Krabbe
 Borgen (2011–2012) – Jacob Kruse
 Badehotellet (2014-) – Edward Weyse

Dubbing 
 Hercules, Danish Version (1997) – Adult Hercules
 Elmo's World, Danish Version (1998) – Kermit
 SpongeBob SquarePants, Danish Version (1999) – SpongeBob
 Toy Story 2, Danish Version (1999)
 Play with Me Sesame, Danish Version (2002) – Various characters
 Finding Nemo, Danish Version (2003)
 LazyTown, Danish Version (2004)
 Johnny Test, Danish Version (2005) – Dukey
 The Simpsons Movie, Danish Version (2007) – Krusty the Clown, Lenny
 Alvin and the Chipmunks (2007) – Simon
 Monsters University (2013) – Randall Boggs
 Kitty Is Not a Cat Danish Version (2018) – Mr. Clean

Voice director 
 Elmo's World, Danish Version (1998)
 Play with Me Sesame, Danish Version (2002)

External links 
 
 Jens Jacob Tychsen on the Danish Film Institute

1975 births
Living people
Danish male actors
Danish male voice actors
Casting directors
Danish voice directors